This is a list of submissions to the 58th Academy Awards for Best Foreign Language Film. The Academy Award for Best Foreign Language Film was created in 1956 by the Academy of Motion Picture Arts and Sciences to honour non-English-speaking films produced outside the United States. The award is handed out annually, and is accepted by the winning film's director, although it is considered an award for the submitting country as a whole. Countries are invited by the Academy to submit their best films for competition according to strict rules, with only one film being accepted from each country.

For the 58th Academy Awards, thirty films were submitted in the category Academy Award for Best Foreign Language Film. The bolded titles were the five nominated films, which came from France, Hungary, West Germany and Yugoslavia and the eventual winner, The Official Story, from Argentina. It became the first Latin American film to win the award.

Submissions

References

58